Wallatiri (Aymara wallata snow ball, snow lump; Andean goose, -(i)ri a suffix, translated as "abundance of Andean geese" or "habitat of the Andean geese", Hispanicized spelling Huallatire) is a mountain in the northwestern extensions of the Barroso mountain range in the Andes of Peru, about  high. It is situated in the Tacna Region, Tarata Province, Tarata District.

References 

Mountains of Peru
Mountains of Tacna Region